Altaria is a Finnish heavy metal band from Jakobstad, who have released four albums on the record label Metal Heaven, a fifth on Escape Music and a sixth on Reaper Entertainment.

History 

In January 2008, the band decided to part ways with their record label Metal Heaven for undisclosed reasons. In the same month, bass player Marko Pukkila parted ways with the band after an argument concerning the split with Metal Heaven, and was replaced as vocalist by Ex-Terrorwheel bass player, Marco Luponero. After that, the only original member still active with Altaria at the time was Tony Smedjebacka.

Towards the later part of 2008 the band announced on their website that they were in the process of writing songs for their fifth (fourth full) studio album. In March 2009, they stated that they had finished recording 12 tracks for their upcoming release. The title had yet to be confirmed, but one track had already been completed, entitled "Pride and Desire". Altaria's fifth studio album, Unholy, was released in May 2009.

After nearly five years of inactivity, the band, together with former bass player Marko Pukkila got together for Altaria's final concert at Nummirock 2016 on 23 June.

In December 2019, the band announced through their new website that the 2006 lineup had returned, and were recording material for a sixth album for a late 2020 release. They also remastered their second album, Divinity, which was released on 27 March 2020. In April 2022, the band announced their new album, Wisdom, would be released on July 8.

Members 
Current lineup
Tony Smedjebacka – drums 
Marko Pukkila – bass 
Taage Laiho – lead vocals 
Juha Pekka Alanen – guitar 
Petri Aho – guitar 

Former members
Jani Liimatainen – guitars, keyboards 
Johan Mattjus – lead vocals 
Emppu Vuorinen – guitars 
Jouni Nikula – lead vocals 
Marco Luponero – lead vocals , bass

Timeline

Discography 
 Sleeping Visions (2001 demo)
 Feed the Fire (2002 demo)
 Invitation (Metal Heaven, 2003)
 Divinity (Metal Heaven, 2004)
 The Fallen Empire (Metal Heaven, 2006)
 Divine Invitation (2007)
 Unholy (Escape Music, 2009)
 Wisdom (Reaper Entertainment, 2022)

References

External links 
 Official website (archived)
 

Finnish power metal musical groups